Baby Looney Tunes' Eggs-traordinary Adventure is a 2003 American traditionally animated comedy direct-to-video film from Warner Bros. Animation. It is a special based on the television series Baby Looney Tunes. The special follows the main characters from Baby Looney Tunes as they go on a search for the true meaning of Easter.

The producers were Gloria Yuh Jenkins and Tom Minton, both of whom had worked on the television series. Korean studio Dong Woo Animation provided the animation. Eggs-traordinary Adventure was released on VHS and DVD formats on February 11, 2003 and on Boomerang in March 2017.

Plot
After Granny reads a story about Easter and the Easter Bunny, the babies become excited about it. Taz is most excited about this, but Granny tells him that Easter isn’t until one more day, upsetting him. Daffy does not believe in any of this stuff and tries to convince everyone that there is no such thing as the Easter Bunny. Later on, Lola and Tweety throw an Easter party for Taz and invite Bugs. However, Daffy tries to convince Bugs that there is still no Easter Bunny and tells Bugs to grow up and forget it and Bugs angrily agrees and tears the decorations down, upsetting Lola and Tweety.

During nap time, Tweety and Lola suggest to Sylvester that they should take Taz to the forest by following the pages in Granny’s book. However Daffy is shocked to find them gone and he and Bugs go out to find them. Bugs, wearing a blue raincoat and boots and Daffy, covered in yellow paint and a leaf around his waist, paint rocks  to look like Easter eggs. While, finding the rocks, Taz falls in the river and is rescued by Bugs and Daffy.  However, the "eggs" turn out to be rocks and the yellow paint washes off Daffy in the river. They all finally realize that there is no Easter Bunny until the next morning, they wake up to find real Easter eggs, delighting Taz. Sylvester is given a chocolate chicken, which means the Easter Bunny did come and it turns out to be a happy Easter after all.

Voice cast
 June Foray as Granny
 Sam Vincent as Baby Bugs, Baby Daffy, and Baby Tweety
 Ian James Corlett as Baby Taz
 Terry Klassen as Baby Sylvester
 Britt McKillip as Baby Lola

References

2003 films
2003 comedy films
2003 animated films
2003 direct-to-video films
2000s American animated films
2000s children's adventure films
2000s children's comedy films
2000s children's animated films
2000s adventure comedy films
2000s English-language films
American children's animated adventure films
American children's animated comedy films
American adventure comedy films
American direct-to-video films
Looney Tunes films
Bugs Bunny films
Daffy Duck films
Sylvester the Cat films
Tasmanian Devil (Looney Tunes) films
Tweety films
Films about babies
Easter Bunny in film
Warner Bros. direct-to-video animated films
Warner Bros. Animation animated films